Youssef Benibrahim (born 19 July 1983) is a Paralympic athlete from Morocco competing mainly in category T13 long-distance events.

Biography
He competed in the 2008 Summer Paralympics in Beijing, China.  There he won a silver medal in the men's 5000 metres - T13 event and finished fourth in the men's 1500 metres - T13 event.

At the 2017 World Para Athletics Championships held in London, United Kingdom he won the gold medal in the men's 5000 metres T13 event.

Notes

External links
 

Paralympic athletes of Morocco
Athletes (track and field) at the 2008 Summer Paralympics
Athletes (track and field) at the 2016 Summer Paralympics
Paralympic silver medalists for Morocco
1983 births
Living people
Medalists at the 2008 Summer Paralympics
Paralympic medalists in athletics (track and field)
Moroccan male long-distance runners
21st-century Moroccan people